Karen Gaviola is an American television producer and director. She is the winner of the 2007 NAACP Image Award for directing "The Whole Truth" episode of the ABC hit series Lost. She was also nominated for the 2013 WIN (Women's Image Network) Award for best directing of the "Georgia on My Mind" episode of the Shonda Rhimes series Private Practice.

Life and career 
Karen is a second-generation Filipina American. She is a graduate of Immaculate Heart High School (Los Angeles) and Harvard College.

Gaviola has directed over 140 TV episodes, including the shows Lucifer, Shadow and Bone, Empire, Sons of Anarchy, The Blacklist, Hawaii Five-0,  CSI: Crime Scene Investigation,  Grimm, Criminal Minds and Chicago Fire.

More recently, she has worked as a co-executive producer/director on a number of projects including Lucifer, Hawaii Five-0, Magnum P.I. and Love Is for Oprah Winfrey. Her latest project is Paper Girls, the new Amazon series based on the graphic novels by Brian K. Vaughan.

Gaviola was elected in June 2013 to the National Board of the Directors Guild of America. She is currently serving her fifth term. She is active with the DGA TV Creative Rights Committee, the Women's Steering Committee, the Asian American Committee, and the Diversity Task Force. In 2022, Gaviola was named as co-chair of the 2023 DGA/AMPTP Negotiations Committee.  Karen is also a member of the Producers Guild of America, the Academy of Television Arts and Sciences, and Film Independent.

Filmography

References

NAACP Image Award winners
Official DGA website
https://www.tor.com/2020/07/23/brian-k-vaughan-paper-girls-amazon-prime-studios-greenlight-serie/

External links

Official DGA website
Karen Gaviola website

American television directors
American women television directors
Living people
Year of birth missing (living people)
Harvard College alumni